Ammobatini is a tribe of cuckoo bees in the family Apidae. There are about 8 genera and more than 130 described species in Ammobatini.

Genera
These eight genera belong to the tribe Ammobatini:
 Ammobates Latreille, 1809
 Chiasmognathus Engel, 2006
 Melanempis Saussure, 1890
 Oreopasites Cockerell, 1906
 Parammobatodes Popov, 1931
 Pasites Jurine, 1807
 Sphecodopsis Bischoff, 1923
 Spinopasites Warncke, 1983

References

Further reading

External links

 

Nomadinae
Articles created by Qbugbot